2 Corinthians 3 is the third chapter of the Second Epistle to the Corinthians in the New Testament of the Christian Bible. It is authored by Paul the Apostle and Timothy (2 Corinthians 1:1) in Macedonia in 55–56 BC. Biblical commentator Heinrich Meyer emphasises that the use of the plural 'we' in 2 Corinthians 3:2 ("in our hearts") and 2 Corinthians 3:6 ([we are] "ministers of the new covenant") includes Timothy in the writing of the letter.

Text
The original text was written in Koine Greek. This chapter is divided into 18 verses.

Textual witnesses
Some early manuscripts containing the text of this chapter are:
Papyrus 46 (~AD 200)
Codex Vaticanus (325–350)
Codex Sinaiticus (330–360)
Codex Alexandrinus (400–440; complete)
Codex Ephraemi Rescriptus (~450)
Codex Freerianus (~450; extant verses  6–7,16–17)
Codex Claromontanus (~550)

Verse 2
 You are our epistle written in our hearts, known and read by all men;

Verse 3
New King James Version
 Clearly you are an epistle of Christ, ministered by us, written not with ink but by the Spirit of the living God, not on tablets of stone but on tablets of flesh, that is, of the heart.
King James Version
 Forasmuch as ye are manifestly declared to be the epistle of Christ ministered by us, written not with ink, but with the Spirit of the living God; not in tables of stone, but in fleshy tables of the heart.
"The epistle of Christ ministered by us": The apostles and ministers of the Word were only "amanuenses", whereas Christ was the "author and dictator" (i.e., who dictates the Word).
"Written... with the Spirit of the living God": the believers become the "living epistles of Christ" as a "living disposition of the soul in likeness to Him."
"Tables of stone": on Mount Sinai the primary (Mosaic) law was written on tables of stone. They were made twice: the first by God Himself, the latter were hewed by Moses, at the command of God,). The former are said to be "miraculously made, and not by the means and artifice of men",  which, the Jewish writers say, were made of sapphire, but they were broken by Moses when he came down from the mount. Both the former and the latter were of two stones of an equal size, in the form of small tables, such as for children to learn to write, each with the dimensions of six hands long, six hands broad and three hands thick, weighing forty "seahs" (a miracle that Moses should be able to carry them). On these stones were written the "Ten Commandments", that five were written on one table, and five on the other, as noted by Josephus, Philo, and the Talmudic writers, and were written on both sides.
The phrase "table of the heart" is found in the books of the Old Testament (Jeremiah 17:1) and very frequently in the writings of the Jews.

Verse 6
who also made us sufficient as ministers of the new covenant, not of the letter but of the Spirit; for the letter kills, but the Spirit gives life.
"Made us sufficient as ministers": This is an answer to the question in (2 Corinthians 2:16: who is sufficient for these things?) that 'our sufficiency' is of God, for he had enabled Paul and his co-workers to be "sufficient ministers", which is totally God's making.

Verse 17
Now the Lord is the Spirit; and where the Spirit of the Lord is, there is liberty.
"Liberty": this means freedom from the law (cf. Galatians 5:18) and the transformation of believers.

Verse 18
But we all, with unveiled face, beholding as in a mirror the glory of the Lord, are being transformed into the same image from glory to glory, just as by the Spirit of the Lord.
"By the Spirit of the Lord": or "from the Lord, the Spirit"
"The same image": The image of the believer, reflected as in a mirror, becomes that of Christ (cf.).

See also
Jesus Christ
Titus
Related Bible parts: Exodus 24, Exodus 31, Exodus 34, Jeremiah 31, Ezekiel 11, Matthew 22, Matthew 26, Romans 13

References

Sources

External links
 King James Bible - Wikisource
English Translation with Parallel Latin Vulgate
Online Bible at GospelHall.org (ESV, KJV, Darby, American Standard Version, Bible in Basic English)
Multiple bible versions at Bible Gateway (NKJV, NIV, NRSV etc.)

2 Corinthians 3